Jan Winquist (born 30 May 1939) is a Finnish sailor. He competed in the Finn event at the 1968 Summer Olympics.

References

External links
 

1939 births
Living people
Finnish male sailors (sport)
Olympic sailors of Finland
Sailors at the 1968 Summer Olympics – Finn
Sportspeople from Helsinki